Savate was featured in the Summer Olympic Games demonstration programme in 1924.

A demonstration of La canne was associated with an assault between Professor Prévot and the champion of France Beauduin.

See also

References

Olympics
Olympics
1924 introductions
Discontinued sports at the Summer Olympics
Men's events at the 1924 Summer Olympics